Universidad Técnica Particular de Loja (UTPL) is a private institution that provides on-campus and continuing education programmes. There are 23 Bachelor's degrees on the Loja campus and 20 continuing education programmes.

It is considered the best distance-modality university of Ecuador and has abroad campuses in Rome, Madrid and New York.

History

It was officially recognised by the Ecuadorian State according to the executive decree No. 646 published in the official record No. 217 on May 5, 1971. With this the UTPL becomes an autonomous corporate organization that is protected by the "Modus Vivendi" document formalized between the Saint Principal Office and the Ecuadorian State, keeping in mind the norms of the Church in its organization and governance.

It was the fundate for the Ecuadorian "Marista" Group (EMG) founded the UTPL on May 3, 1971 with the approval and the support of the Diocese of Loja and run by the same group until October 1997.

Nowadays the UTPL is administered by the Religious Association "Id of Redeeming Christ" Idente Missionaries.

Organization
The Universidad Técnica Particular de Loja has two modalities of study:  23 Bachelor's degrees on campus Loja (P) and 20 continue education programmes (D).

Careers
 Administration Area
Ingeniería Administración Empresas P - D
Ingeniería Administración Banca y Finanzas P - D
Accountancy P - D
Ingeniería Administración Empresas Turísticas y Hoteleras P - D
Economics P - D
 Area Biologica
Bioquimica y Farmacia P
Gestión Ambiental P - D
Ingeniería Agropecuaria  P
Ingeniería Industrias Agropecuarias P
Ingeniería Quimica P
Biology P
Medical Sciences P
 Area Socio Humanística
Law P - D
Journalism P - D
Psychology P - D
Relaciones Públicas P
Ciencias de la Educación mención Ciencias Humanas y Religiosas D
Ciencias de la Educación mención Educación Básica D
Ciencias de la Educación mención Lengua y Literatura D
Ciencias de la Educación mención Físico Matemático D
Ciencias de la Educación mención Educación Infantil D
Ciencias de la Educación mención Químico Biológicas D
Ciencias de la Educación mención Inglés P - D
Technical Area
Architecture P
Art and Design P
Geology P
Civil Engineering P
Electronics and Telecommunications Engineering P
Computer Science P - D

Research
The UTPL use the Centros de Investigación Transferencia de Tecnología, Extensión y Servicios (CITTES) as a center for applied research.

External links
University website
Revista Iberoamericana de Educación a Distancia, The Ibero-American Review of Distance Education
Instituto Iberoamericano y del Caribe de Calidad en Educación Superior a Distancia, Latin American and Caribbean Institute for Quality in Distance Higher Education with participation of CREAD, AIESAD, VirtualEduca
Instituto Latinoamericano de la Familia, Latinoamerican Institute of Family with de CIEC, OIEC, CONFEDEC
Instituto Iberoamericano de Educación para la Paz y no violencia, Ibero-American Institute for Peace Education and Non-Violence with UMCE
Educational Repository
OCW Initiative
Open UTPL, Open Resources

Universities in Ecuador
Scientific organisations based in Ecuador
Educational institutions established in 1971
1971 establishments in Ecuador